John Henry Buczek (born 1943/1944) is an American professional golfer.

Golf career 
Buczek attended Wake Forest University, majored in Business, and graduated in 1967. Buczek played for Wake Forest's legendary golf team. They won the first of 10 straight ACC Championships in Buczek's senior year.

Buczek was the first American to win on the South African Tour. He won the 1972 Holiday Inns Royal Swazi Sun Open held in Mbabane, Swaziland. Buczek started the final round tied with England's Peter Oosterhuis. Buczek shot a final round 67 to win by one over defending champion Cobie Legrange. He outplayed Oosterhuis, then regarded as one of the world's best players, by five shots.

At the 1974 U.S. Open at Winged Foot Golf Club, Buzcek was in the top 10 for the first two rounds. He shot 83-73 over the weekend and finished T35. He would work as Winged Foot's sixth head professional, much later in his career, from 2006 to 2009.

Buczek was Director of Instruction at Wake Forest Golf Academy.

In 2018, Buczek was recognized as one of the six head professionals who served throughout the 50-year history of Grandfather Golf & Country Club in Linville, North Carolina.

Professional wins

South African Tour (1) 

1972 Holiday Inns Royal Swazi Sun Open

Other wins 

1970 Westchester Open
1973 New Jersey PGA Championship
1974 New Jersey State Open

References 

American male golfers
Wake Forest Demon Deacons men's golfers
Living people
1940s births